Brigada Siete is a Philippine television investigative documentary show broadcast by GMA Network. It premiered on December 5, 1993. The show concluded on September 29, 2001. The show was revived in 2011 as Brigada.

After Louie Beltran's death by 1994, Tito Sotto took over on November 6 and continued his role until 2000. By that time, it was reformatted as a magazine show.

Hosts

 Louie Beltran 
 Jessica Soho 
 Arnold Clavio 
 Tito Sotto

Accolades

References

External links
 

1993 Philippine television series debuts
2001 Philippine television series endings
Filipino-language television shows
GMA Network original programming
GMA Integrated News and Public Affairs shows
Peabody Award winners
Philippine documentary television series